Bishops of Przemyśl archdiocese:

Diocesan bishops
?-1351? - Iwan
1352-1375? - Mikołaj Rusin
1377-1391 - Eryk z Winsen
1392-1420 - Maciej Janina
1420-1435 - Janusz z Lubienia
1436-1452 - Piotr z Chrząstowa
1452-1474 - Mikołaj z Błażejowa
1475-1481 - Andrzej Oporowski (administrator, from 1479 bishop )
1482-1484 - Piotr Moszyński
1484-1485 - Jan Kaźmierski
1486-1492 - Jan z Targowiska
1492-1498 - Mikołaj Krajowski
1501-1503 - Andrzej Boryszewski
1503-1514 - Maciej Drzewicki
1514-1520 - Piotr Tomicki
1520-1523 - Rafał Leszczyński
1523-1527 - Andrzej Krzycki
1527-1531 - Jan Karnkowski
1531-1535 - Jan Chojeński
1535-1537 - Piotr Gamrat
1537-1544 - Stanisław Tarło
1545-1559 - Jan Dzieduski
1560-1560 - Filip Padniewski
1560-1572 - Walenty Herburt
1574-1577 - Łukasz Kościelecki
1577-1583 - Wojciech Staroźrebski Sobiejuski
1583-1584 - Jan Borukowski
1585-1591 - Wojciech Baranowski
1591-1601 - Wawrzyniec Goślicki
1601-1608 - Maciej Pstrokoński
1608-1619 - Stanisław Sieciński
1619-1624 - Jan Wężyk
1624-1627 - Achacy Grochowski
1627-1631 - Adam Nowodworski
1631-1635 -  Henryk Firlej
1635-1636 - Andrzej Szołdrski
1636-1642 - Piotr Gembicki
1642-1644 - Aleksander Trzebiński
1644-1649 - Paweł Piasecki
1649-1654 - Jan Zamoyski
1654-1658 - Andrzej Trzebicki
1658-1677 - Stanisław Sarnowski
1677-1688 - Jan Stanisław Zbąski
1698-1701 - Jerzy Albrecht Denhoff
1701-1718 - Jan Kazimierz de Alten Bokum
1719-1724 - Krzysztof Andrzej Jan Szembek
1724-1734 - Aleksander Antoni Fredro
1734-1741 - Walenty Aleksander Czapski
1741-1760 - Wacław Hieronim Sierakowski
1760-1764 - Michał Wodzicki
1765-1766 - Walenty Wężyk 
1766-1768 - Andrzej Stanisław Młodziejewski
1768-1783 - Józef Tadeusz Kierski
1783-1786 - Antoni Wacław Betański
1786-1824 - Antoni Gołaszewski
1825-1832 - Jan Antoni de Potoczki
1834-1839 - Michał Korczyński
1840-1845 - Franciszek Ksawery Zachariasiewicz
1846-1860 - Franciszek Ksawery Wierzchleyski
1860-1862 - Adam Jasiński
1863-1869 - Antoni Monastyrski
1870-1881 - Maciej Hirschler
1881-1900 - Łukasz Solecki
1900-1924 - Józef Sebastian Pelczar
1924-1933 - Anatol Nowak
1933-1964 - Franciszek Barda
1965-1992 - Ignacy Tokarczuk

Metropolitan archbishops
1992-1993 - Ignacy Tokarczuk
1993-nadal    - Józef Michalik

Suffragan bishops
1681-1691 - Jan Dębski
1692-1699 - Ludwik Załuski
1699-1714 - Paweł Konstanty Dubrawski
1714-1717 - Łukasz Jacek Czermiński
1718-1720 - Stanisław Hozjusz
1721-1723 - Michał Piechowski
1723-1728 - Franciszek Szembek
1728-1759 - Andrzej Pruski
1761-1765 - Hieronim Wielogłoski
1768-1769 - Michał Witosławski
1769-1769 - Antoni Onufry Urbański, (d. before consecration)
1770-1776 - Stanisław Wykowski
1778-1786 - Michał Roman Sierakowski
1781-1783 - Antoni Wacław Betański
1882-1885 - Ignacy Łobos
1887-1898 - Jakub Glazer
1889-1900 - Józef Sebastian Pelczar
1901-1931 - Karol Józef Fischer
1931-1933 - Franciszek Barda
1933-1967 - Wojciech Tomaka
1957-1983 - Stanisław Jakiel
1964-1993 - Bolesław Łukasz Taborski	
1970-1993 - Tadeusz Błaszkiewicz	
1984-2004 - Stefan Moskwa	
1988-1993 - Edward Białogłowski	
1989-1993 - Edward Marian Frankowski	
2000-nadal - Adam Szal	
2005-nadal - Marian Rojek